Microsoft To Do (previously styled as Microsoft To-Do) is a cloud-based task management application. It allows users to manage their tasks from a smartphone, tablet and computer. The technology is produced by the team behind Wunderlist, which was acquired by Microsoft, and the stand-alone apps feed into the existing Tasks feature of the Outlook product range.

History 
Microsoft To Do was first launched as a preview with basic features in April 2017. Later more features were added including Task list sharing in June 2018.

In September 2019, a major update to the app was unveiled, adopting a new user interface with a closer resemblance to Wunderlist. The name was also slightly updated by removing the hyphen from To-Do.

See also 
 Wunderlist

References

External links 

Microsoft cloud services
Microsoft Office
Task management software